Sergy may refer to the following places in France:

 Sergy, Ain, a commune in the department of Ain
 Sergy, Aisne, a commune in the department of Aisne